The 2014 NASCAR Toyota Series was the eighth season of the NASCAR Toyota Series, and the eleventh season organized by NASCAR Mexico. It began with the Toyota 120 at Phoenix International Raceway on February 28, and ended with the Puebla 240 at Autódromo Miguel E. Abed in Puebla, on November 9. Rodrigo Peralta entered the season as the defending Drivers' Champion.

Abraham Calderón won his first series championship at Puebla, finishing nine points ahead of Rubén García Jr.; both drivers failed to win any races during the season, but were able to finish strongly in the five-race Desafío, which concluded the season. Calderón achieved eleven top-ten finishes, while Garcia Jr. took ten top-ten finishes. Rubén Rovelo finished third in the championship, eleven points in arrears of Calderón, winning races at Aguascalientes and Tuxtla Gutiérrez.

Six other drivers won races during the season, including Daniel Suárez, who won a total of five races including three of the first four races. A pair of finishes outside the top 20 in the Desafío saw Suárez finish in 6th in the championship. Irwin Vences, who made the Desafío despite missing the first four races of the season, won two races as well, winning the first Puebla race and the second San Luis Potosí event. Rubén Pardo (the first event at Querétaro and Chihuahua) and Homero Richards (the second Querétaro event, and the season-ending Puebla event) each won two races, while Luis Felipe Montaño – at Autódromo Hermanos Rodríguez – and Rogelio López, at the first San Luis Potosí race, each took one win.

Drivers

Schedule

Results and standings

Races

Notes
1 – The qualifying session for the México 240 was cancelled due to heavy rain. The starting line-up was decided by championship points.
2 – The qualifying session for the Tuxtla 240 was cancelled due to heavy rain. The starting line-up was decided by championship points.

Drivers' championship

(key) (Bold – Pole position awarded by qualifying time. Italics – Pole position earned by points standings or practice time. * – Most laps led.)

Notes
1 – Jim Nides, Jorge Contreras, Sr., Israel Jaitovich and Javier Fernández all received championship points, despite the fact that they did not qualify for the race.
2 – Carlos Anaya and Alejandro Capín received championship points, despite the fact that they were excluded from the race.

See also

2014 NASCAR Sprint Cup Series
2014 NASCAR Nationwide Series
2014 NASCAR Camping World Truck Series
2014 NASCAR K&N Pro Series East
2014 NASCAR K&N Pro Series West
2014 NASCAR Whelen Modified Tour
2014 NASCAR Whelen Southern Modified Tour
2014 NASCAR Canadian Tire Series
2014 NASCAR Whelen Euro Series

References

NASCAR Toyota Series

NASCAR Mexico Series